Jan Šimůnek (born 20 February 1987 in Prague) is a Czech former professional footballer who played as a defender. He made four appearances for the Czech Republic national team.

Career
In 2017 Šimůnek joined Hungarian club Vasas SC.

Career statistics

Honours
VfL Wolfsburg
 Bundesliga: 2008–09

Czech Republic U21
FIFA U-20 World Cup: runner-up  2007

References

External links 
 
 

1987 births
Living people
Czech footballers
Footballers from Prague
Association football defenders
Czech Republic youth international footballers
Czech Republic under-21 international footballers
Czech Republic international footballers
Czech First League players
Bundesliga players
2. Bundesliga players
Regionalliga players
Nemzeti Bajnokság I players
AC Sparta Prague players
SK Kladno players
VfL Wolfsburg players
VfL Wolfsburg II players
1. FC Kaiserslautern players
1. FC Kaiserslautern II players
VfL Bochum players
FK Dukla Prague players
Vasas SC players
Czech expatriate footballers
Czech expatriate sportspeople in Germany
Expatriate footballers in Germany
Czech expatriate sportspeople in Hungary
Expatriate footballers in Hungary